Forbes Ernest Phillipson-Masters (born 14 November 1955) is an English former footballer who played in the Football League as a central defender for Southampton, Exeter City, AFC Bournemouth, Luton Town, Plymouth Argyle and Bristol City.

Playing career
Phillipson-Masters was born in Bournemouth. He originally signed with Southampton as an apprentice goalkeeper in August 1972, but was given a free transfer two years later by Lawrie McMenemy. John McGrath, then Saints' youth team coach, persuaded the player to try his luck in the centre-half position. The conversion was successful, and, after playing nine times for the Saints first team, and spending spells on loan to Exeter City, AFC Bournemouth and Luton Town, Phillipson-Masters was sold to Plymouth Argyle for £50,000 in 1979, where he was to make over a hundred league appearances. He went on to Bristol City, where he made nearly another hundred, before winding up his career with a season with Yeovil Town.

Later career
In 1987, he moved into non-League football management in the Dorset area, and now has his own building company in Verwood, Dorset.

Personal life
Ollie Phillipson-Masters, son of Forbes, has played for Bournemouth "Poppies" F.C. of the Wessex League since August 2009.

References

External links
 League stats at Neil Brown's site

1955 births
Living people
Footballers from Bournemouth
English footballers
Association football defenders
Southampton F.C. players
Exeter City F.C. players
AFC Bournemouth players
Luton Town F.C. players
Plymouth Argyle F.C. players
Bristol City F.C. players
Yeovil Town F.C. players
English Football League players
House painters